Hannover is a German city.

Hannover may also refer to: 
 Hannover (aircraft), airplanes produced by Hannoversche Waggonfabrik
 Hannover Re, an insurance company based in Hanover, Germany
 Hannover Airport, Hanover's international airport
 Hannover Hauptbahnhof, Hanover's main railway station
 Hannover Messe, the world's biggest industrial fair
 Hannover 96, German association football team currently playing in the Bundesliga
 Hannover Indians, German ice hockey team
 Hannover Scorpions, German ice hockey team
 MV Hannover, a Norddeutscher Lloyd cargo liner captured by the Royal Navy in 1940
 Zeche Hannover, a former mine complex in Hordel, part of the city of Bochum in the Ruhr area in North Rhine-Westphalia

Other uses 
 Hannoversche Waggonfabrik, a former manufacturer of trains, cars and airplanes, known as "Hannover" in English
 Hannoversch Münden (confluence in Hanover), a town in Lower Saxony, former Province of Hanover

See also 
 Hanover (disambiguation)